Islam or Islaam (Arabic: إِسْلَام islām) is an Arabic male or female given name and surname meaning "acceptance, agreement approval (the truth)", "god-fearing, humility, devoutness", "acknowledgment, admission, yield, obeyance", "obedience, preservation, protection, safeguarding, keeping", "piety, loyalty, devotion", "subjection, submissiveness, wonder, admiration, respect, submitting".

Also, the name of the religion Islam and solely a Muslim name.

The name Islam is a diminutive of the name Aslam (أَسْلَم aslam), which both names stems from the male noun-name Salaam.

It may refer to:

People with the surname 
Abu Hena Saiful Islam, US Navy's imam
Aktar Islam – Restaurateur, curry chef and businessman
Faisal Islam (born 1977), British journalist
Jahurul Islam (cricketer) (born 1986), Bangladeshi cricketer
K M Baharul Islam, Dean of the Indian Institute of Management Kashipur
Kazi Nazrul Islam (1899–1976), Bengali revolutionary poet
Mitchell Islam (born 1990), Canadian figure skater
Mohammad Manjural Islam (born 1979), Bangladeshi cricketer
Naeem Islam (born 1986), Bangladeshi cricketer
Nurul Islam – Broadcast journalist, radio producer and presenter
Nurul Islam Nahid, former Education Minister of Bangladesh
Rizza Islam (born 1990), member of the Nation of Islam and social media influencer
Rupam Islam, Bengali Singer & Musician under Bangla Rock Genre, Kolkata, West Bengal
Runa Islam – Film and photography visual artist, who was nominated for the 2008 Turner Prize
Sabirul Islam – Author, entrepreneur and motivational speaker
Sanchita Islam – Artist, writer and filmmaker
Shafiul Islam (born 1989), Bangladeshi cricketer
Shahara Islam –The youngest victim killed during the 7 July 2005 London bombings
Syed Manzoorul Islam, critic, writer, former professor of Dhaka University
Taijul Islam (born 1992), Bangladeshi cricketer
Umar Islam, formerly Brian Young (born 1978), member of the foiled 2006 transatlantic aircraft plot
Yusuf Islam British singer, born Stephen Demetre in 1948 and formerly known as Cat Stevens

People with the given name 
Islam Makhachev (born 1991), Russian mixed martial artist, UFC Lightweight Champion
Islam Slimani (born 1988), Algerian football player
Islam Karimov (1938–2016), president of Uzbekistan
Islam El-Shater (born 1976), Egyptian football player
Izharul Islam Chowdhury, Bangladeshi Islamic scholar
Saif al-Islam Gaddafi (born 1972), Libyan political figure and son of former Libyan leader Muammar Gaddafi
Noor Islam Dawar, Pakistani Pashtun human rights activist

Bengali Muslim surnames